Acrocercops tenera is a moth of the family Gracillariidae. It is known from India (Bihar), Indonesia (Java) and Sri Lanka.

The larvae feed on Schleicheria oleosa and Schleicheria trijuga. They probably mine the leaves of their host plant.

References

tenera
Moths of Asia
Moths described in 1914